Greenough was an electoral district of the Legislative Assembly in the Australian state of Western Australia from 1890 to 2008.

Greenough was one of the original 30 seats contested at the 1890 colonial election. The district was based in the northern part of Western Australia's Wheatbelt region. It was abolished in 2008 when the number of rural districts was reduced.

Geography
Greenough was a rural electorate, surrounding but not including the coastal city of Geraldton. At its abolition, it included the towns of Kalbarri, Northampton, Mullewa, Morawa, Dongara and Three Springs.

History
Although held on occasion by Labor, Greenough was typically a conservative seat. By the time of its abolition, it was a very safe non-Labor seat. The district was captured by the National Party when it was last contested at the 2005 state election. That ended the Liberal Party's 60-year hold on the seat.

Greenough was abolished ahead of the 2008 state election, as a result of the reduction in rural seats made necessary by the one vote one value reforms. Its former territory was split between the districts of Geraldton and Moore. Following Greenough's abolition, the sitting National MP, Grant Woodhams, contested the seat of Moore.

Members for Greenough

Election results

External links
 
 
 

Former electoral districts of Western Australia